Spilomyia crandalli, Crandall's Hornet Fly, is a rare species of syrphid fly first officially described by  Curran in 1951. This species is found in western North America near the Pacific coast. Hoverflies get their names from the ability to remain nearly motionless while in flight. The adults are also known as flower flies for they are commonly found around and on flowers, from which they get both energy-giving nectar and protein-rich pollen. The larvae are known as the short-tailed larvae, suited for moist areas such as rot holes of trees.

Distribution
Arizona, New Mexico (USA)
Mexico

References

Eristalinae
Insects described in 1951
Diptera of North America
Hoverflies of North America
Taxa named by Charles Howard Curran